Pleasant Park may refer to:

 Pleasant Park, Ontario, Canada
 Pleasant Park station, Ottawa, Canada
 Pleasant Park Public School, Ottawa, Canada
 Pleasant Park, South Australia in the Hundred of Mingbool, South Australia
 A park in Apex, North Carolina
 A locale in the video game Fortnite Battle Royale

See also
 Point Pleasant Park